Aqbolagh-e Sofla (also Romanized as Āqbolāgh-e Soflá; also known as Āq Bolāgh, Āq Bolāgh-e Pā’īn, and Aq Bulāq) is a village in, and the capital of, Aq Bolagh Rural District of Sojas Rud District of Khodabandeh County, Zanjan province, Iran. At the 2006 National Census, its population was 723 in 144 households. The following census in 2011 counted 739 people in 164 households. The latest census in 2016 showed a population of 597 people in 162 households.

References 

Khodabandeh County

Populated places in Zanjan Province

Populated places in Khodabandeh County